KCPX (1490 AM) is a news/talk formatted broadcasting radio station. Licensed to Spanish Valley, Utah, United States, the station is currently owned by Moab Communications, LLC.

References

External links

Radio stations established in 2009
2009 establishments in Utah
CPX
News and talk radio stations in the United States